The 1998 CA-TennisTrophy was a men's tennis tournament played on indoor carpet courts at the Wiener Stadthalle in Vienna, Austria and was part of the Championship Series of the 1998 ATP Tour. It was the 24th edition of the tournament and was held from 12 October through 19 October 1998. First-seeded Pete Sampras, who entered the event on a wildcard, won the singles title.

Finals

Singles

 Pete Sampras defeated  Karol Kučera 6–3, 7–6(7–3), 6–1
 It was Sampras' 4th title of the year and the 58th of his career.

Doubles

 Yevgeny Kafelnikov /  Daniel Vacek defeated  David Adams /  John-Laffnie de Jager 7–5, 6–3
 It was Kafelnikov's 4th title of the year and the 34th of his career. It was Vacek's only title of the year and the 20th of his career.

References

External links
 ATP tournament profile
 ITF tournament edition details

 
CA-TennisTrophy
Vienna Open